The 1924 Ohio gubernatorial election was held on November 4, 1924. Incumbent Democrat A. Victor Donahey defeated Republican nominee Harry L. Davis with 53.97% of the vote.

General election

Candidates
Major party candidates
A. Victor Donahey, Democratic
Harry L. Davis, Republican 

Other candidates
Virgil D. Allen, Commonwealth Land
Franklin J. Catlin, Socialist Labor

Results

References

1924
Ohio
Gubernatorial